Zeinabad is a village in Rudqat Rural District, Sufian District, Shabestar County, East Azerbaijan Province, Iran. At the 2006 census, its population was 887, in 205 families.

References 

Populated places in Shabestar County